"One More Mountain to Climb" is a song written by Neil Sedaka and Howard Greenfield, originally released by Sedaka on his album Emergence in 1970.

Two hit records came from cover versions of the song, one in Canada and the other in New Zealand, both of which hit #14 in their respective country's chart in 1971. The Canadian hit was recorded and released Dr. Music.  The song was featured on their 1971 album, Dr. Music. Dr. Music's recording of the song was produced and arranged by Doug Riley. The New Zealand hit was recorded and released by Craig Scott.

It is not to be confused with the Ronnie Dove song, which reached #45 on the Billboard Hot 100 in 1967.

Other versions
Skylark released a version of the song on their 1974 album, 2.
David Soul released a version of the song on his 1976 album, David Soul.

References

1971 songs
1971 singles
Songs written by Neil Sedaka
Songs with lyrics by Howard Greenfield
Neil Sedaka songs
David Soul songs
Craig Scott songs